Alexander Erler and Lucas Miedler defeated Nathaniel Lammons and Jackson Withrow in the final, 7–6(11–9), 7–6(7–3) to win the doubles tennis title at the 2023 Mexican Open.

Feliciano López and Stefanos Tsitsipas were the reigning champions, but withdrew before the tournament due to Tsitsipas' shoulder injury.

Wesley Koolhof and Neal Skupski will regain the ATP number 1 doubles ranking from Rajeev Ram at the end of the tournament. Joe Salisbury was also in contention for the top ranking at the start of the tournament.

Seeds

Draw

Draw

Qualifying

Seeds

Qualifiers
  Guido Andreozzi /  Guillermo Durán

Qualifying draw

References

 Main draw
 Qualifying draw

Abierto Mexicano Telcel - Doubles
2023 Doubles